South Carolina Highway 64 (SC 64) is a  primary state highway in the U.S. state of South Carolina. It serves the cities of Barnwell and Walterboro while also providing a direct route to Charleston, via U.S. Route 17 (US 17).

Route description

History
SC 64 was established around 1926 as a new primary routing from SC 28 near Ellenton, to SC 6/SC 301 near Ruffin. In 1928, SC 64 was extended east to US 17 in Walterboro, replacing part of SC 6.  Around 1930, SC 64 was extended east again on new routing to US 78/SC 2 in Summerville.  By 1932, SC 64 was extended east again at US 17 in Moncks Corner. In 1939, all sections of SC 64 were paved.

In 1950, SC 64 was extended in both directions: northeast with a concurrency with SC 28 to SC 781 in Beech Island and east replacing SC 179 to Jamestown, then north in concurrency with SC 511, then east to end at US 521, west of Georgetown.

Around 1952, SC 64's routing had a major shake-up. A section of SC 64 remained northwest of the Savannah River Site to Beech Island. East of Walterboro, SC 64 was rerouted to US 17, replacing what was US 17, to its current eastern terminus in Jacksonboro; its old alignment was replaced completely by US 17 Alternate (US 17 Alt.). In 1953, the Beech Island section of SC 64 was renumbered as part of SC 125.

By 1955, SC 64 was widened to a divided four-lane highway from the Savannah River Site to Barnwell. In 1973, SC 64 was widened to a divided four-lane with its concurrency with US 301. In 1976, SC 64 was widened to four lanes between Interstate 95 (I-95) to Walterboro. Between 1983 and 1985, SC 64 was placed on a new bypass going north and east of Walterboro, leaving SC 64 Business (SC 64 Bus.) along its old downtown route.

Major intersections

Related routes

Olar alternate route

South Carolina Highway 64 Alternate (SC 64 Alt.) was an alternate route that existed in Olar. It was established in July 1937 from SC 64 to SC 5 (now US 321). It used Dana Avenue and 4th Street. In 1947, it was decommissioned.

Walterboro business loop

South Carolina Highway 64 Business (SC 64 Bus.) is a business route that follows the original mainline route through downtown Walterboro, via Bells Highway, Jeffries Boulevard, Paul Street, Wichman Street, Padgett Loop and Hampton Street.

It was established between 1983 and 1985 when mainline SC 64 was bypassed north and east of Walterboro.

Walternboro alternate route

South Carolina Highway 64 Alternate (SC 64 Alt.) was an alternate route that existed in the eastern part of Walterboro. It was established by 1940 from U.S. Route 17 (US 17; now SC 64) to SC 64 (now US 17 Alternate). It used Padgett Loop. In 1947, it was decommissioned. Today, it is part of SC 64 Business.

South Carolina Highway 64Y

South Carolina Highway 64Y (SC 64Y) was a spur route that existed entirely within the northeastern part of Colleton County. By 1940, it was established from an intersection with SC 64 (now US 17 Alternate) in Round O to a point north of the community. By 1943, it was decommissioned and downgraded to a secondary road. Today, it is known as Round O Road.

See also

References

External links

 
 Mapmikey's South Carolina Highways Page: SC 64
 Mapmikey's South Carolina Highways Page: Former SC 64 Alternate
 Mapmikey's South Carolina Highways Page: SC 64 Business
 Mapmikey's South Carolina Highways Page: Former SC 64-Y

064
Transportation in Barnwell County, South Carolina
Transportation in Bamberg County, South Carolina
Transportation in Colleton County, South Carolina
U.S. Route 17